On Broadway is an independent film, shot in Boston in May 2006, starring Joey McIntyre, Jill Flint, Eliza Dushku, Mike O'Malley, Robert Wahlberg, Amy Poehler and Will Arnett.

Plot
Emotionally devastated by the death of his uncle, Boston carpenter Jack O'Toole (McIntyre) writes a play inspired by the man's wake. When nobody will produce the play, Jack quits his job to produce it himself, imagining that this play will give a new start to the strained relationship Jack has with his father. But the only stage Jack can afford is in the back room of a neighborhood pub. In this humble environment, Jack pulls together a theater company of sorts and brings his story to the stage, and in the process he brings together his family and friends and helps them move beyond their loss.

Cast
 Joey McIntyre as Jack O'Toole, a carpenter turned playwright
 Eliza Dushku as Lena Wilson, the lead actress in Jack's play
 Mike O'Malley as Father Rolie O'Toole, Jack's priest brother
 Sean Lawlor as Martin O'Toole, Jack's estranged father
 Will Arnett as Tom, the actor and Jack's friend
 Amy Poehler as Farrah, Tom's wife
 Lance Greene as Billy O'Toole, Pete's son and Jack's cousin
 Robert Wahlberg as Kevin Sheehan, Jack's cousin
 Vincent Dowling as Augie Burke, a friend of the O'Tooles
 Lucas Caleb Rooney as Neil Quinn, Jack's friend
 Jill Flint as Kate O'Toole, Jack's wife
 Andrew Connolly as Pete O'Toole, Jack's late uncle

Credits
The film was written and directed by playwright/screenwriter Dave McLaughlin and shot by cinematographer Terrence Fitzgerald Hayes. The film was produced by Charlie Harrington.

Additional cast members included Vincent Dowling, Sean Lawlor, Lucas Caleb Rooney, Lance Greene, Andrew Connolly, Peter Giles, Dossy Peabody, Will Harris and Nancy E. Carroll.

Release
On Broadway had its festival release at a sold-out premiere at the Independent Film Festival of Boston on April 27, 2007. It received good reviews. The film went on to screen at the film festivals of Woods Hole, Galway, New Hampshire, Hoboken, New Jersey, Waterfront, Napa and Northampton. It won an award for Best Feature in the Galway Film Fleadh, another for Audience Best Feature in the Woods Hole Film Festival, the Grand Jury Prize for Best Film in the New Hampshire Film Festival and had six nominations in the Hoboken Film Festival.  At the 2007 Phoenix Film Festival On Broadway won the Sundance Channel Audience Award for Best Film, and Joey McIntyre won the Best Breakthrough Performance Award at the same festival.

On Broadway had a theatrical release on March 14, 2008 in Boston at the Somerville Theater, West Newton Cinema, Sharon Cinemas 8 and Dedham Community Theater.

References

External links
 
 
 

2007 films
American independent films
Films about writers
Films set in Boston
2007 drama films
American drama films
Films shot in Boston
2007 independent films
2000s English-language films
2000s American films
English-language drama films